A payment in lieu of taxes (usually abbreviated as PILOT, or sometimes as PILT) is a payment made to compensate a government for some or all of the property tax revenue lost due to tax exempt ownership or use of  real property.

Canada
The federal government of Canada makes payments in lieu of taxes to local governmental entities (including First Nations) where the federal government owns real property.

United States
In the United States, payment in lieu of taxes can arise in several  ways:

 Land owned by the federal government is generally not subject to taxation by state or local governments.  Under Public Law 94-565, enacted in 1976, the federal government began making payments in lieu of taxation to local governments affected by this reduction in their tax bases.
 In some states where land owned by colleges and universities is not subject to local property taxes, the state government reimburses the local governments for part of the tax revenue that the local government would otherwise have collected. In other cases, the institution makes a direct payment to the local government (which would not otherwise be reimbursed) simply to maintain good relations.
 PILOTs may be negotiated in specific circumstances, as when an arrangement is made for a corporation or institution to build a facility on public land without assuming ownership of the land.  For example, New York state  has several such programs.  In conjunction with the proposal to build a West Side Stadium in New York City for use by the New York Jets, there was controversy over the proposal by the Mayor, Michael Bloomberg, to use PILOT money from the Jets to help finance the project rather than applying it to other municipal expenses.  The Port Authority of New York and New Jersey, a bi-state public authority, makes payments in lieu of taxes to New York City under an agreement relating to its ownership of the World Trade Center site.
 Similarly, where a non-profit organization may be exempt from equipment taxes and sales taxes, its mission may permit payment of an agreed PILOT to the local tax authorities, to offset the impact upon local services funded by town residents.  The size of such payments can be controversial, especially where the organization appears to have federal income from taxable activities. For example, the tax-exempt Appalachian Mountain Club operates a modern hotel for its members in Carroll, New Hampshire, paying a negotiated PILOT amount to the town.  A competing commercial hotel would also pay "meals and beds" taxes.
 As an incentive for investment in taxable infrastructure or other facilities that create a public benefit, a PILOT may be negotiated to limit or defer the property taxes on a developer, striking a balance between public and private economic needs. In effect, the local taxpayers are subsidizing the development, which might otherwise have gone elsewhere.  This has occurred in poor rural areas where large wind energy systems are often placed, providing cost relief to the owner and a limited tax payment to the locals.

Payments in lieu of taxes for nonprofit organizations are voluntary. However, some cities want this to change. At issue are the vast amounts of land owned by universities, hospitals, churches, and other nonprofit organizations. The tax-exempt status granted to these entities by the IRS means that property taxes that would have been paid to municipalities had this land been owned by private individuals or companies are not collected.

According to a 2010 report by the Lincoln Institute of Land Policy, between 2000 and 2010 PILOTs were used in at least 18 states. Seventeen of those states account for 35 cities and towns with PILOTs. In addition, 82 out of a total of 351 municipalities in Massachusetts have collected PILOTs (Massachusetts Department of Revenue 2003). A map in this report also reveals that although these 18 states can be found scattered across the country, the vast majority of this activity seems to be concentrated in the northeast.

For many municipalities in the United States, property taxes are a primary source of revenue. The amount of forgone tax revenue as a result of these tax-exempt land parcels is significant. The president of the city council of Baltimore, MD, recently estimated that his city loses $120 million annually from these foregone taxes.

At the same time, these entities enjoy the same level of service the rest of the residents of the given city or county enjoy. These services include fire, police, sewer, trash collection, etc. It is argued that asking some, or all, nonprofits to pay taxes, either voluntarily, or via statutory measures, would help offset some of these costs and ease the strain on local budgets. This would be equivalent to increasing the tax base in these areas. Many nonprofits, whose own budgets are dwindling, fear this trend.

See also 
Tenement for legal reasons
Endowment tax

References

External links
 "Payments in Lieu of Taxes" - explanation of the U.S. program, by the Bureau of Land Management
 PILT (Payments in Lieu of Taxes): Somewhat Simplified Congressional Research Service
 Connecticut's PILOT Program (in PDF)
 Canada's PILT Program
 Michigan's PILT program

Property taxes
Real property law